Siegfried Cruden (born 28 November 1959) is a Surinamese former sprinter. He competed in the men's 400 metres at the 1984 Summer Olympics.

References

1959 births
Living people
Athletes (track and field) at the 1984 Summer Olympics
Surinamese male sprinters
Surinamese male middle-distance runners
Olympic athletes of Suriname
Place of birth missing (living people)